Hickory Ridge is an unincorporated community in Cape Girardeau County, in the U.S. state of Missouri.

History
A post office called Hickory Ridge was established in 1856, and remained in operation until 1875. The community was named after a nearby ridge where hickory timber was abundant.

References

Unincorporated communities in Cape Girardeau County, Missouri
Unincorporated communities in Missouri